Bandwagon with Bob Francis is a Canadian music variety television series which aired on the CBC between September 21, 1972 and June 21, 1973 then February 13 to March 28, 1975. The show was hosted by Bob Francis who presented big band music performances. Bob Francis sometimes performed as vocalist and trumpet player Guido Basso also performed. Aubrey Tadman and Garry Ferrier produced and Barry Cranston directed.

External links

 Queen's University Directory of CBC Television Series (Bandwagon with Bob Francis archived listing link via archive.org)
MemorableTV article
Canadian Communications Foundation article

1972 Canadian television series debuts
1975 Canadian television series endings
CBC Television original programming
1970s Canadian variety television series